Lazarus ("Lajarus") Barla (born April 11, 1979 in Tilaikani, near Sundargarh, Odisha) is a field hockey defender from India, who belongs to the Oraon tribe of Chota Nagpur. 

He made his international senior debut for the Men's National Team in January 1998 during the test series against Germany. He represented his native country at the 2000 Summer Olympics in Sydney, Australia, where India finished in seventh place.

References
 Bharatiya Hockey

External links

1979 births
Living people
Male field hockey defenders
1998 Men's Hockey World Cup players
Field hockey players at the 2000 Summer Olympics
2002 Men's Hockey World Cup players
Olympic field hockey players of India
People from Odisha
Field hockey players from Odisha
Indian male field hockey players
Asian Games medalists in field hockey
Field hockey players at the 1998 Asian Games
Asian Games gold medalists for India
Medalists at the 1998 Asian Games